Robert Jahrling (born 14 February 1974) is an Argentinian-born Olympian rower of East German parentage who competed for Australia at three Olympic Games. He was an Australian state and national champion, a medallist at World Rowing Championships and won a silver medal at the 2000 Sydney Olympics in the men's eight.

Personal
Jahrling was born in East Berlin, Germany. His parents, Marina Wilke and Harald Jährling, are both Olympic gold medallists in rowing for East Germany. His mother – the coxswain of the East German women's eight – was not yet sixteen when Jahrling was born. Jahrling attended Newington College (1991–1992) and was coached by Robert Buntine and Michael Morgan. He holds a BA (Commerce) and a Masters in International Finance, Accounting, Marketing & Management from Monash University where he graduated in 2000. According to LinkedIn Jahrling completed further education at Massachusetts Institute of Technology MIT, Columbia Business School, Stanford University, Yale School of Management, University of Oxford and Harvard Business School. Jahrling works as an investment banker at Deutsche Bank where he is a Managing Director and the Head of Equities.

Club and state rowing
Jahrling's senior club rowing was done from Sydney Rowing Club, where he is an Honorary Life Member. He was first selected to represent New South Wales in the 1993 men's senior eight contesting the King's Cup at the Interstate Regatta within the Australian Rowing Championships. He raced in further King's Cup eights for New South Wales in 1994, 1995, 1998, 2000, 2002 and 2004. His King's Cup career was during a period of Victorian dominance and Jahrling only saw one NSW victory – in 2004.

In Sydney Rowing Club colours Jahrling contested numerous national titles at the Australian Rowing Championships. He won 7 national championships and 21 New South Wales state championship titles.

Jahrling represented Australia at 3 Olympic Games (1x Silver), 8 World Championships, 3 Commonwealth Games (1 Gold, 1 Silver, 1 Bronze) and over 50 World Cup regattas:
6th Place 1996 Atlanta Olympics M8+
2nd Place 2000 Sydney Olympics M8+
3rd Place 2002 World Championships Seville M2-
4th Place 2004 Athens Olympics M4-
7x Australian Champion
21x NSW State Champion
1x Kings Cup Gold 
7x Kings Cup Silver

Accolades
Jahrling is a five time New South Wales Rower of the Year recipient and has been involved in fund raising activities for Step to the Future and Mission Australia. He is an Honorary Life Member of Sydney Rowing Club and a member of the Olympians Club of Australia. He was awarded the keys to the City of Sydney as part of the 2000 Olympic team and in 2002 he won the Australian National Sports Star award for achievements in both sport and business.

Post-rowing career
From 2000, Jahrling worked as an investment banker for Credit Suisse in Australia and Deutsche Bank in Hong Kong. Later he became a managing director at Citi in Australia and the Head of Equity Syndicate.

References

1974 births
Living people
Australian male rowers
Rowers at the 1996 Summer Olympics
Rowers at the 2000 Summer Olympics
Rowers at the 2004 Summer Olympics
People educated at Newington College
Olympic medalists in rowing
Medalists at the 2000 Summer Olympics
Olympic rowers of Australia
Olympic silver medalists for Australia
World Rowing Championships medalists for Australia